Elections were held in Grey County, Ontario on October 27, 2014 in conjunction with municipal elections across the province.

Grey County Council
The Grey County Council consists of the mayors and deputy mayors of each of the constituent communities.

The Blue Mountains

Chatsworth

Georgian Bluffs

Grey Highlands

Hanover

Meaford

Owen Sound

Southgate

West Grey

References
 

Grey
Grey County